Graphelysia is a genus of moths in the family Noctuidae. It contains only one species, Graphelysia strigillata, which can be found in south-eastern Peru; it was historically misclassified on multiple occasions, but in 2010 was determined to belong to the subfamily Agaristinae.

References

Agaristinae
Monotypic moth genera
Moths of South America